The von Braun reaction is an organic reaction in which a tertiary amine reacts with cyanogen bromide to an organocyanamide. 
An example is the reaction of N,N-dimethyl-1-naphthylamine:

These days, most chemist have replaced cyanogen bromide reagent with chloroethyl chloroformate reagent instead. It appears as though Olofson et al. was the first chemist to have reported this.

Reaction mechanism

The reaction mechanism consists of two nucleophilic substitutions: the amine is the first nucleophile displacing the bromine atom which then acts as the second nucleophile. In following the mechanism is described using trimethylamine as example:

First, the trimethylamine reacts with the cyanogen bromide to form a quaternary ammonium salt, which in the next step reacts by splitting off bromomethane to give the dimethylcyanamide. This is a second-order nucleophilic substitution (SN2).

See also
 von Braun amide degradation

References

Organic reactions
Name reactions